St. Mary's is a town in the Canadian province of Newfoundland and Labrador. The town had a population of 313 in the Canada 2021 Census.

The majority of employment in the community is from the local seafood processing plant, operating in summer months. Most plant workers receive E.I. benefits during the off season.  There was briefly a fish sauce plant that used the byproduct of the main processing plant.  The town has a Catholic church, a bed & breakfast (which provides the only overnight accommodations in the area), a small pub, and 2 gas stations which also serve as convienence stores.

Point La Haye Beach is a popular picnic location in summer, and is located very near an automated lighthouse and long, natural barachois.
Other than this, there are little tourist attractions in the area, and most tourists are travellers of the Irish Loop Drive, passing through the town.

Climate

Demographics 

See also
Avalon Peninsula
List of cities and towns in Newfoundland and Labrador
Newfoundland outport
St. Mary's Bay

References

Towns in Newfoundland and Labrador